Matrei in Osttirol is a market town in the Lienz District in the Austrian state of Tyrol (East Tyrol). Its municipal area comprises parts of the Granatspitze Group and the Venediger Group, with the Großvenediger peak as its highest point. The population largely depends on tourism, seasonal agriculture and forestry.

Location

History
The settlement of Matereie was first mentioned in an 1170 deed, its name derived from Indo-European mater ("mother"). It appeared as Windisch Matrei in 1335, in order to distinguish it from North Tyrolean Matrei am Brenner. The denotation Wendish refers to the Slavs. It remained the official name of the municipality until 1921.

In the mid 8th century, the Slavic principality of Carantania had been incorporated by the German stem duchy of Bavaria, which itself became part of the Frankish Carolingian Empire in 788. The East Tyrolean area down to the Drava river was Christianised by missionaries from the Archdiocese of Salzburg in the north, its sphere of influence confirmed by Emperor Charlemagne in 811. Upon the Carolingian fragmentation of the 9th century, it belonged to the Lurngau, a county of the re-established Bavarian duchy within East Francia. 

In 976 the lands became part of the Duchy of Carinthia, though the Archbishops of Salzburg from 1207 onwards held the lordship of Matrei, making it a Salzburg exclave south of the Alpine divide and a thorn in the side of the Counts of Tyrol, who had expanded their estates into the surrounding areas. In 1252 Count Meinhard I of Gorizia-Tyrol occupied the area but finally had to renounce his claims to the Matrei manor in favour of Salzburg. The episcopal administration was provided by a burgrave residing at Weißenstein Castle.

Though Matrei received market rights, it remained isolated from the neighbouring Tyrolean territories and was not easily reachable from the adjacent Salzburg Pinzgau region across the passes of Hohe Tauern range. Trading was poorly developed and the situation of the rural population was miserable, culminating in several revolts against the episcopal rule from the German Peasants' War in 1525 until the 18th century. During the Napoleonic Wars, the last Prince-Archbishop of Salzburg, Count Hieronymus von Colloredo fled to Vienna in 1800, the archbishopric was secularised in 1803 and fell to the Austrian Empire upon the 1805 Peace of Pressburg.

In 1814 Emperor Francis I of Austria decreed the merger of Matrei into his Tyrolean crown land, thereby ending 600 years of isolation. It nevertheless remained a rural area, from the mid 19th century with the sideline source of mountaineering tourism, marked by the first ascent of the Großvenediger peak in 1865. The accessibility was largely improved by the construction of the Felbertauern road tunnel in 1967.

Population

References

External links

 Matrei in Osttirol - Tourist information website

Villgraten Mountains
Cities and towns in Lienz District